Kretzulescu Church ( or Crețulescu) is an Eastern Orthodox church in central Bucharest, Romania. Built in the Brâncovenesc style, it is located on Calea Victoriei, nr. 45A, at one of the corners of Revolution Square, next to the former Royal Palace. 

The church was commissioned in 1720–1722 by the boyar Iordache Crețulescu and his wife Safta, a daughter of prince Constantin Brâncoveanu. Originally, the exterior was painted, but since the restoration work done in 1935–1936 (under the supervision of architect ), the façade is made of brick. The frescoes on the porch date from the original structure, while the interior frescoes were painted by Gheorghe Tattarescu in 1859–1860.  

The church, damaged during the 1940 Vrancea earthquake, was repaired in 1942–1943. In the early days of the communist regime, Kretzulescu Church was slated for demolition, but was saved due to efforts of architects such as Henriette Delavrancea-Gibory. More  renovations took place after the Bucharest earthquake of 1977 and the Revolution of 1989. To the side of the church now stands a memorial bust of Corneliu Coposu.

See also
 Crețulescu Palace

Gallery

External links
 "Places to visit in Bucharest – Crețulescu Church"

Romanian Orthodox churches in Bucharest
Churches completed in 1722
Historic monuments in Bucharest
Calea Victoriei
1722 establishments in the Ottoman Empire